The 1949–50 League of Ireland was the 29th season of senior football in the Republic of Ireland.

Changes from 1948–49 
No new teams were elected to the League.

Teams

Season overview
Cork Athletic won their first title.

Table

Results

Top goalscorers

Ireland
League Of Ireland, 1949-50
League of Ireland seasons